Paul Pleiger (28 September 1899, in Buchholz, now part of Witten, Westphalia – 22 July 1985, in Hattingen) was a German state adviser and corporate general director.

The miner's son underwent training as an engineer and soon afterwards established himself as a small-scale entrepreneur and machine factory owner. He later created Paul Pleiger Handelsgesellschaft in 1952, specializing in the manufacturing of polyurethane cast elastomers for Bayer's Vulkollan.

Quite early on – the exact date has been lost – he joined the NSDAP. For the Party, Pleiger functioned as a Gau economic adviser in the Gau of Westphalia-South (Westfalen-Süd), before he was summoned to the Raw Materials Office in Berlin in 1934.

In 1937, Hermann Göring transferred to Pleiger the management of the Reichswerke AG für Erzbergbau und Eisenhütten "Hermann Göring", commonly known as the Reichswerke Hermann GörIng, an industrial establishment dealing in ore mining and iron, which was huge but unprofitable, but nevertheless deemed necessary to further Germany's growth and power. In 1941, Pleiger became Reich commissioner for Nazi Germany's coal supply, and in 1942 "Reich Commissioner for the Whole Economy of the East".

In the Ministries Trial at Nuremberg, Pleiger was convicted and sentenced to 15 years in prison in 1949.  He was released from prison in 1951. One of his lawyers was Robert Servatius, who had defended Fritz Sauckel in the Nuremberg trials of the main war criminals, Karl Brandt in the Doctors' trial and later also Adolf Eichmann.

As General Director of the Hermann Göring Reich Works, Pleiger was one of the Third Reich's most influential economic functionaries and state entrepreneurs. As Reich Commissioner for the Eastern Economy, along with his position at the Göring Works, he was jointly responsible for the exploitation of people and material from Nazi-occupied lands.

After his retirement from the company he founded,  operations continued under the direction of his son Dr. Paul Pleiger, Jr., who died in an automobile accident in 1983.  His company would later see expansions to South Korea, Germany, and the United States.

See also 
Ministries Trial

References 

1899 births
1985 deaths
People from Witten
People from the Province of Westphalia
Nazi Party politicians
Nazi Party officials
Sturmabteilung personnel
People convicted by the United States Nuremberg Military Tribunals
Recipients of the Knights Cross of the War Merit Cross